Thurrock and Basildon College was a further education college in Grays, Essex, England (Woodview Campus) and Basildon, Essex, England (Nethermayne Campus). It was formed by the merger of Thurrock Technical College and Basildon College. The college merged with South East Essex College of Arts and Technology on 1 January 2010 to form South Essex College.

The Nethermayne Campus of Basildon college opened on 13 September 1971.

References

Educational institutions with year of establishment missing
Educational institutions disestablished in 2010
Education in Thurrock
Further education colleges in Essex
Defunct universities and colleges in England